Time is a song by Tom Waits appearing on his eighth studio album Rain Dogs. It was written by Waits and was recorded in 1985 at RCA Studios in New York City.

It was covered by Tori Amos for her 2001 concept album Strange Little Girls. Amos made a notable appearance on the Late Show with David Letterman to perform the song; it was the first musical performance on the show after the September 11 attacks.

"Time" was covered again in 2019 by Rosanne Cash for Come On Up to the House: Women Sing Waits, a Tom Waits tribute album featuring female artists' covers of Waits' songs.

Accolades 

(*) designates unordered lists.

Personnel
Adapted from the Rain Dogs liner notes.
 Tom Waits – vocals, guitar, production
Musicians
William Shimmel – accordion
Larry Taylor – double bass
Production and additional personnel
 Dennis Ferrante – recording
 Tom Gonzales – recording
 Robert Musso – engineering, mixing
 Howie Weinberg – mastering

In popular culture 
The song was used in "The Mother Box Origins” clip for 2021s Zack Snyder's Justice League.

The song was used in Gilmore Girls: A Year in the Life Winter Episode for a flashback of Richard Gilmore’s funeral.

See also
Tom Waits discography

References 

1985 songs
Tom Waits songs
Songs written by Tom Waits